Isgandar Javad ogly Javadov (born 2 August 1956) is a former Azerbaijani professional footballer.

Club career
He made his professional debut in the Soviet Top League in 1977 for Neftchi Baku PFC. He played 2 games and scored 1 goal in the UEFA Cup 1982–83 for FC Dynamo Moscow.

Personal
Javadov is the uncle of Azerbaijani international football player Vagif Javadov, whilst his brother Füzuli Javadov was also football player.

References

1956 births
Footballers from Baku
Living people
Soviet footballers
Association football forwards
FC Dynamo Moscow players
Soviet Top League players
FC Zimbru Chișinău players
Neftçi PFK players
Kapaz PFK players
Soviet Azerbaijani people